Desulfobacter curvatus is a sulfate-reducing bacteria, with type strain AcRM3.

References

Further reading
Sneath, Peter HA, et al. Bergey's manual of systematic bacteriology. Volume 2. Williams & Wilkins, 2012.
Atlas, Ronald M. Handbook of microbiological media. Vol. 1. CRC press, 2004.
Dworkin, Martin, and Stanley Falkow, eds. The Prokaryotes: Vol. 2: Ecophysiology and Biochemistry. Vol. 2. Springer, 2006.

External links

LPSN
Type strain of Desulfobacter curvatus at BacDive -  the Bacterial Diversity Metadatabase

Desulfobacterales
Bacteria described in 1988